Jeremiah Beckett (24 December 1919 – August 1959) was an Irish Gaelic footballer and hurler who played left corner-forward for the Cork senior teams.

Beckett joined the hurling team during the 1941 championship and was a regular member of the starting fifteen in both codes until his retirement after the 1947 football championship. During that time he won one All-Ireland medal and one Munster medal in hurling as well as one All-Ireland medal and one Munster medal in football. Beckett is one of only eighteen dual players to have won All-Ireland medals in both codes.

At club level Beckett played his club hurling and football with a range of clubs including Sarsfields, Glanmire, St Finbarr's and UCC.

References

1919 births
1959 deaths
Sarsfields (Cork) hurlers
St Finbarr's hurlers
UCC hurlers
Glanmire Gaelic footballers
St Finbarr's Gaelic footballers
Cork inter-county hurlers
Cork inter-county Gaelic footballers
All-Ireland Senior Hurling Championship winners
Winners of one All-Ireland medal (Gaelic football)
Dual players